is a Japanese professional baseball player. He is currently with the Saitama Seibu Lions in Japan's Nippon Professional Baseball. In 2008, he was selected Most Valuable Player of the 2008 Asia Series.

References

External links

1978 births
Japanese baseball coaches
Japanese baseball players
Keio University alumni
Living people
Nippon Professional Baseball coaches
Nippon Professional Baseball outfielders
Baseball people from Kanagawa Prefecture
People from Fujisawa, Kanagawa
Saitama Seibu Lions players
Seibu Lions players